Nabilatuk District  is a district in Northern Uganda.

References

Districts of Uganda
Karamoja